This battle took place in December 1615 off La Goulette, Tunisia, and was a victory for a Spanish privateer squadron under Francisco de Ribera over a Tunisian fleet.

Ships involved

Spain (Ribera)

 San Juan Bautista 36

Tunis
 19 armed ships - 4 vessels of 18-20 guns captured -  One of the preys sank before reaching port due to battle damage

Notes

References
 

La Goulette
La Goulette
La Goulette
17th century in Tunisia
1615 in Africa
1615 in the Ottoman Empire